Spider-Man and His Amazing Friends is a 1981–1983 American animated television series produced by Marvel Productions, considered to be a crossover series connected to the 1981 Spider-Man series. The show stars already-established Marvel Comics characters Spider-Man and Iceman, including an original character, Firestar. As a trio called the Spider-Friends, they fight against various villains of the Marvel Universe.

Production
The series was an attempt by NBC to replicate some of the success ABC enjoyed with the Super Friends franchise. The makers of the show originally intended the stars to be Spider-Man, Iceman, and the Human Torch. However, legal issues about the rights to the Human Torch character (which had also plagued Marvel once before for the 1978 Fantastic Four cartoon) led to the Human Torch being replaced by a new character, Firestar, who had similar powers, but was a mutant like Iceman. Due to Firestar's popularity with fans, she has since become a part of the mainstream Marvel Universe. In pre-production, Firestar's codename changed frequently; the unused names include Firefly, Starblaze, and Heatwave.

Marvel Comics maintained a high level of creative control over the series, with Stan Lee (co-creator of both Spider-Man and Iceman) working with the screenwriters and involving himself in the casting and animation.

Some of the sound effects used in the series originated from Universal Television's Battlestar Galactica and Buck Rogers in the 25th Century. Adding Ms. Lion, a pet, as a character was another attempt to emulate the Super Friends (specifically the characters Wonder Dog and Gleek).

Firestar actress Kathy Garver recalled that though the storyboards for each episode were completed before the voices were recorded for it, "... we really just worked from script. We'd do a roundtable to get the feeling of how the show was going, and then we would record."

Broadcast schedule
Originally broadcast on NBC as a Saturday morning cartoon, the series ran first-run original episodes for three seasons, from 1981 to 1983, then aired repeats for an additional two years (from 1984 to 1986). Alongside the 1981 Spider-Man animated series, Amazing Friends was later re-aired in the late 1980s as part of the 90-minute Marvel Action Universe, a syndicated series that was used as a platform for old and new Marvel-produced animated fare (the newer programming featured RoboCop: The Animated Series, Dino-Riders and on occasion X-Men: Pryde of the X-Men, which was a pilot for a potential X-Men animated series). Toei Animation, and Daewon Media contributed some of the animation for this series.

Season changes and popularity
During the first season, each episode contained a cold open, which was and remains unusual for a children's cartoon. When the same episodes were re-aired later in the series' run, these teaser sequences were edited to fit after the titles and episode card. Still, the original sequence infrequently showed up on NBC's re-airings. Stan Lee did not originally narrate the episodes from this season.

In the second season, the show aired along with a newly produced Hulk animated series as The Incredible Hulk and the Amazing Spider-Man. The two shows shared one intro which showcased the new title. In place of the cold opens from the first season, Marvel Productions created 12-second previews aired immediately preceding the episodes. Stan Lee began narrating the episodes in the second season. Marvel Productions also added narrations by Lee to the first-season episodes at this time to give the series cohesion. Neither first nor second season narrations appear on the current masters, and they have not aired since the NBC airings (as seen on the Stan Lee narration list at Spider-Friends.com).

For the third season, the characters' billing was reversed and the show was called, The Amazing Spider-Man and the Incredible Hulk. It remained that way for most of the remaining years. NBC did air the show individually in mid-season (post 1986) after it was not initially announced for their fall schedule. Only some of the Stan Lee narrations for the third season are on the current masters. The missing narrations have not aired since the NBC airings.

Storyline
Peter Parker (Spider-Man), Bobby Drake (Iceman), and Angelica Jones (Firestar) are all college students at Empire State University. After working together to defeat the Beetle and recovering the "Power Booster" he stole from Tony Stark (a.k.a. Iron Man) the trio decide to team-up permanently as the "Spider-Friends". They live together in Peter's aunt's home with her and a pet dog named Ms. Lion, a Lhasa Apso who was adopted by Firestar. Together, the superheroes battle various supervillains.

Some stories featured team-ups with other superheroes including but not limited to Captain America, Thor, Sunfire, and the mid-1970s X-Men.

Characters

Original characters
A number of characters in the series were original characters that did not appear in the comics prior to the premiere of the series:

Firestar

One of the series' main characters, Firestar was created specifically for this series when the Human Torch was unavailable (due to licensing issues). The original plan was for Spider-Man to have fire and ice based teammates, so Angelica Jones/Firestar was created. Her pre-production names included Heatwave, Firefly, (both having already been names of DC Comics villains) and Starblaze.

Firestar did not appear in Marvel's mainstream comic book universe until Uncanny X-Men #193 (May 1985). She appears as a member of the Hellions, a group of teenage mutants who functioned as rivals to the New Mutants (a similar group under the tutelage of Charles Xavier). After leaving the Hellions, Firestar becomes a founding member of the New Warriors and later serves as a distinguished member of the Avengers along with her fellow New Warrior, Justice. She is currently a member of the X-Men.

Hiawatha Smith
Hiawatha Smith is a college professor at the Spider-Friends' university. He is the son of a heroic Native American chief who fought against the Axis during World War II.

Hiawatha Smith's home is adorned with decorations from various cultures including Hindu and native African tribes. Producer and story editor Dennis Marks created the character and admits to basing him on Indiana Jones.

Smith's father passed down to his son the mystic knowledge of their people and a map leading to a vast Nazi treasure of wealth and advanced technology sought by the Red Skull. Smith often employs a boomerang in battle. He possesses a supernatural ability to communicate with animals.

Lightwave

Lightwave's real name is Aurora Dante. Like her older half-brother Bobby Drake (a.k.a. the superhero Iceman), Lightwave is a mutant. She can manipulate and control light. Her other light-based powers include laser blasts, photonic force fields and solid light pressor beams. She can also transform herself into light; in such a form, she is able to exist in the vacuum of outer space.

Lightwave's only appearance was in "Save the GuardStar", the final episode of the 1980s cartoon. She is voiced by Annie Lockhart. Bobby Drake explains that they share the same mother.

An agent of S.H.I.E.L.D., Lightwave is considered a traitor, due to mind control by rogue S.H.I.E.L.D. agent Buzz Mason. Mason induces Lightwave to steal assorted devices to create a "quantum enhancer" which would increase her powers 1,000 times. With such power, Lightwave would be able to control the GuardStar satellite which orbits the Earth and controls all defense systems and communications systems for the United States. Mason expects world conquest since he controls Lightwave.

Iceman, Firestar, and Spider-Man attempt to stop Lightwave. However, she is powerful enough to defeat them. Aboard a space vessel, Buzz Mason forces Iceman into outer space, dooming Iceman if he remains there for long. Spider-Man convinces Lightwave to realize that the half-brother she loves is in mortal danger. Her reaction breaks Mason's control over her, and she saves Iceman and disables Mason long enough for Spider-Man to subdue him.

Presumably, with Mason's role realized, S.H.I.E.L.D. restores Lightwave's good standing. As this is Lightwave's only appearance, her fate is unknown.

Videoman
Videoman is an intangible two-dimensional being with lightning bolt-shaped horns that is mostly composed of electronic data gleaned from a video arcade. Videoman makes three appearances in the series where there are two version of him.

As a villain
In Season 1, Videoman first appeared as an angular humanoid energy construct created by Electro. Its abilities include moving through and manipulating electronic circuits and projecting rectangular pulses of energy. Videoman is used by Electro to suck in and entrap Spider-Man, Flash Thompson, Firestar and Iceman into a video game display where Electro attempts to destroy the four. However, Flash is able to save himself and the others by escaping through the monitor and into Electro's electronic components to save the others.

This first villainous version of Videoman makes one other appearance in Season 2's "Origin of Ice-Man", with the additional abilities of bringing video game characters to life and draining the unique bio-energy of mutants, temporarily suppressing Iceman's powers and weakening Firestar, as well as being able to emulate their powers for its own use. This time, Videoman is defeated when the Spider-Friends trick it and its video game minions into attacking one another.

As a superhero
In the Season 3 episode "The Education of a Superhero", nerdy Francis Byte is an avid video game player who is especially engrossed into gaining the high score on a game called Zellman Comman at the local arcade. The villain Gamesman sends a hypnotic signal that entrances over 300,000 people in the city. However, it does not affect Francis' girlfriend Louise, Spider-Man, and Firestar, nor does the signal affect Francis' mind, which is distracted from entrancement by Louise and the game. Louise walks away from Francis, then also gets affected and hypnotized after having her pleas disregarded by Francis. He (unbeknownst to any others) plays the arcade machine so rigorously that it and other arcade machines (most of which are emitting the hypnotic waves) explode. The explosion somehow transforms Francis into Videoman.

Francis discovers that he can become his new blue and white, red-eyed alter-ego Videoman at will. However, he is completely inexperienced with his handling of such powerful abilities. He tries to help the trio (which has awakened Iceman from his trance) against a hypnotized mob, but they repel his offers due to his inexperience. He then tries to save Louise from the Gamesman, but he is easily blackmailed into manipulating a military communications satellite system in return for Louise's freedom, an offer that is then reneged upon by the Gamesman. Enraged at the trickery, Videoman helps Spider-Man and the others free Louise and also reverses his stoppage of the military computer. After the Gamesman is defeated, Francis accepts an invitation to join the X-Men, while Louise accepts him and his abilities.

Cast

Credited cast
 Hans Conried - Chameleon (in "7 Little Superheroes")
 Jerry Dexter - Sunfire (in "Sunfire")
 George DiCenzo - Captain America (in "7 Little Superheroes" and "Pawns of the Kingpin"), Lance Macho, Kraven the Hunter (in "The Crime of All Centuries"), Cyclops (in "The X-Men Adventure")
 Alan Dinehart - Boris (in "The Fantastic Mr. Frump"), Sam Blockbuster (in "Spidey Goes Hollywood"), Helicopter Pilot (in "Triumph of the Green Goblin"), Norman Osborn's Pilot (in "Triumph of the Green Goblin"), Police Officer #2 (in "Triumph of the Green Goblin"), Thief #1 (in "Triumph of the Green Goblin"), Security Guard #1 (in "The Crime of All Centuries")
 Walker Edmiston - Frankenstein's Monster (in "The Transylvanian Connection"), Kingpin (in "Pawns of the Kingpin")
 Michael Evans - Professor Wells
 Al Fann - Swarm (in "Swarm")
 June Foray - Aunt May, Crime Computer, Judy
 Kathy Garver - Firestar/Angelica Jones, Sally, Storm (in "The X-Men Adventure")
 Dan Gilvezan - Spider-Man/Peter Parker, Zoltan Amadeus/The Arachnoid (in "Attack of the Arachnoid"), Biker Gang Leader (in "The Crime of All Centuries")
 John Haymer - Skelton (in "The Crime of All Centuries"), Security Guard #2 (in "The Crime of All Centuries"), Black Knight (in "Knights and Demons")
 Sally Julian - Mona Osborn (in "Triumph of the Green Goblin"), Jungle Girl (in "Triumph of the Green Goblin")
 Annie Lockhart - Honey Dove, Storm (in "A Firestar is Born")
 Keye Luke - Sunfire's Uncle Genju (in "Sunfire")
 Dennis Marks - Dr. Faustus (in "Pawns of the Kingpin"), Green Goblin/Norman Osborn (in "Triumph of the Green Goblin"), Police Officer #1 (in "Triumph of the Green Goblin"), Thief #2 (in "Triumph of the Green Goblin"), Cyberiad/Nathan Price (in "The X-Men Adventure")
 Alan Melvin - Electro (in "Videoman")
 Shepard Menkin - Doctor Doom (in "The Fantastic Mr. Frump")
 John Stephenson - Colossus (in "The X-Men Adventure"), Eric the Viking (in "The Vengeance of Loki"), Loki (in "The Vengeance of Loki"), Modred the Mystic (in "Knights and Demons"), Shocker (in "Along Came Spidey"), Surtur (in "The Vengeance of Loki"), Thunderbird (in "The X-Men Adventure"), Ymir (in "The Vengeance of Loki")
 Janet Waldo - Shanna the She-Devil (in "7 Little Superheroes"), Zerona (in "The Vengeance of Loki")
 Frank Welker - Iceman/Bobby Drake, Ms. Lion, Flash Thompson, Matt Murdock (in "Attack of the Arachnoid"), Mr. Jones (in "A Firestar is Born"), Uncle Ben (in "Along Came Spidey"), Videoman/Francis Byte (in "The Education of a Superhero"), Wolf-Thing (in "The Transylvanian Connection")
 William Woodson - Doctor Strange (in "7 Little Superheroes"), Sub-Mariner (in "7 Little Superheroes"), J. Jonah Jameson (in "Spider-Man Unmasked!")
 Alan Young - Mr. Frump (in "The Fantastic Mr. Frump")

Notable guest stars
 Michael Ansara - Hiawatha Smith (in "The Quest of the Red Skull")
 Marlene Aragon - Lightwave (in "Mission: Save the GuardStar")
 Michael Bell - Ariel and Bartow's father (in "Spidey Meets the Girl of Tomorrow"), Doctor Octopus (in "Spidey Meets the Girl of Tomorrow")
 Bob Bergen - Bartow (in "Spidey Meets the Girl of Tomorrow")
 Susan Blu - Louise (in "The Education of a Superhero"), Monica (in "Attack of the Arachnoid")
 William Callaway - Angel (in "A Fire-Star is Born"), Wolverine (in "A Firestar is Born")
 Cathy Cavadini - Ariel (in "Spidey Meets the Girl of Tomorrow")
 Christopher Collins - Sandman (in "Spider-Man Unmasked!"), Beetle (in "The Origin of the Spider-Friends")
 Peter Cullen - Hulk/Dr. Bruce Banner (in "Spidey Goes Hollywood"), Mysterio (in "Spidey Goes Hollywood"), Red Skull (in "The Quest of the Red Skull")
 Stanley Jones - Professor X (in "The Origin of Iceman", "A Firestar is Born", "The X-Men Adventure"), Cyclops (in "A Firestar is Born"), Dean Wilmer (in "A Firestar is Born"), Dracula (in "The Transylvanian Connection"), Nightcrawler (in "The X-Men Adventure")
 William Marshall - Juggernaut (in "A Firestar is Born"), Tony Stark (in "The Origin of the Spider-Friends")
 Noelle North - Sprite/Kitty Pryde (in "The X-Men Adventure")
 Vic Perrin - Thor (in "The Vengeance of Loki!"), Zerona's Soldier (in "The Vengeance of Loki!"), Black Knight (in "Knights and Demons")
 Neil Ross - Scorpion (in "Attack of the Arachnoid")
 Michael Rye - Magneto (in "The Prison Plot")
 Marilyn Schreffler - Bonnie (in "A Firestar is Born")

Crew
 Dick Tufeld - Announcer (Season 1)
 William Marshall - Announcer (Season 2)
 Ron Feinberg - Announcer (Season 3)
 Stan Lee - Narrator (Seasons 2 & 3 and added to re-reruns of Season 1)
 Alan Dinehart - Voice Director

Episodes

Release

Home media
The Complete Seasons 1–3 box set has been released in the UK. This release did not include any of the Stan Lee narrations from the first or second season. Only some of the Stan Lee narrations were in the third season. The first lot of releases by Liberation Entertainment have gone out of print, due to Liberation Films going into bankruptcy. Clear Vision released all 3 seasons on DVD in 2010. This new edition have improved image quality and include German dubbing, while removing the 5.1 audio track and English subtitles. This release has also gone out of print, since Clear Vision ceased operations in 2016. The discs are in Region 2, PAL format.

No Region 1 or other NTSC release is planned at this time.

Streaming
The series was available for instant streaming via Netflix from 2011 to August 2015. As part of the acquisition of 21st Century Fox by The Walt Disney Company, the copyrights to the New World library were transferred to TFCF America, Inc., a subsidiary of The Walt Disney Company, effective March 15, 2019. Consequently, the series became available on the Disney+ streaming service, as a part of U.S. launch on November 12, 2019.

Censorship
The episode "The Quest of the Red Skull" was excluded due to its direct depictions of Adolf Hitler, the Nazi swastika and the phrase 'Heil Hitler'. In 2020, Disney+ placed a warning on the 3rd episode (entitled "Sunfire") for a racially insensitive portrayal of Sunfire. In the episode, Sunfire is portrayed as speaking English with a Japanese accent.

Reception

Critical reception
Adam Levine of Looper said, "The mutant duo became a memorable pairing for Spider-Man, and the series has been fondly remembered in the decades since for its quaint stories, colorful villains, light-hearted nature, and iconic introductions by creator Stan Lee. The animation was a step up from previous attempts, even if it was still relatively simplistic, and stories explored more of Peter Parker's personal life than the 1960s series before it." James Whitbrook of Gizmodo ranked 5th in their "Spider-Man's Best Cartoons" list, stating, "The trio had an excellent dynamic that elevated Amazing beyond its sister show, and as campy as it could be, there’s a reason why it remains beloved by many."

IGN ranked Spider-Man and His Amazing Friends 59th in their "Top 100 Animated Series" list, saying, "The animation was predictably budget for the time, particularly when viewed in this post-Spectacular Spider-Man world of ours, but it was fun nonetheless." Olivia Fitzpatrick of Collider ranked Spider-Man and His Amazing Friend 3rd in their "Every 'Spider-Man' Animated Series" list, asserting, "Speaking of classic, Spider-Man and His Amazing Friends remains a beloved staple of Spider-Man media."

In popular culture
Scenes from Spider-Man and His Amazing Friends were re-cut, edited, and re-dubbed into comical shorts as part of Disney XD's "Marvel Mash-Up" shorts for their "Marvel Universe on Disney XD" block of programming that includes Ultimate Spider-Man and The Avengers: Earth's Mightiest Heroes where scenes from Spidey and His Amazing Friends were also mixed with some scenes from the 1981 Spider-Man cartoon. The cast consists of Dave Boat as Spider-Man, J. Jonah Jameson, Beetle, Sandman, Norman Osborn, Shocker, Thor, Doctor Strange, Wolverine, Colossus, Sprite, Thunderbird, Red Skull, and Magneto, Tom Kenny as Iceman, Firestar, Aunt May, Green Goblin, Mysterio, Kraven the Hunter, Swarm, Captain America, Professor X, Nightcrawler, and Loki, J.P. Karliak as Black Cat and Bruce Banner, James Arnold Taylor as Chameleon, Captain America, Iron Man, and Cyberiad, Dee Bradley Baker as Lizard, Jeff Bennett as Cyclops and Juggernaut, and Travis Willingham as Storm, Ka-Zar, and Doctor Doom.

In the 1984 film Missing in Action starring Chuck Norris, the Spider-Man and his Amazing Friends episode "Along Came Spidey" can be seen on a television.

In her civilian identity, Angelica Jones resembles Peter's girlfriend from the comic books, Mary Jane Watson. This was played up in issues of Spider-Man Loves Mary Jane in which Firestar appeared.

Accolades
Spider-Man and His Amazing Friends was nominated for Best Children's Television Series at the 1982 Young Artist Awards.

Comic books

Adaptation
The first comic book that directly referenced the Amazing Friends show was Spider-Man and His Amazing Friends #1 (December 1981), a one-shot that adapted the pilot episode, "The Triumph of the Green Goblin". Though the comic version altered the story to bring it in line with established Marvel Universe continuity (such as making the Green Goblin identity a costume as in the comics, rather than a physical transformation as in the episode), it was not considered part of said continuity. It is the first appearance of Firestar in a comics story, though the version of Firestar that exists within Marvel continuity would not appear until Uncanny X-Men #193 (May 1985).

The story was reprinted in England in late 1983 in the weekly Marvel UK title Spider-Man and His Amazing Friends. It was reprinted in the U.S. as Marvel Action Universe #1 (January 1989), released to coincide with the airing of Amazing Friends reruns on the television series of the same name and on the 2017 trade paperback X-Men Origins: Firestar.

In the Marvel mainstream continuity, Spider-Man, Firestar and Iceman have made sporadic team-ups in Amazing X-Men #7 (July 2014) and Iceman #3 (November 2018).

Firestar
The mainstream Marvel Universe version of Firestar debuted in the pages of Uncanny X-Men #193 as part of Emma Frost's Hellions team. Firestar was given an origin story in a self-titled mini-series (March – June 1986). The character went on to be a founding member of the New Warriors, and later a member of the Avengers.

One change to Firestar from the TV show to the comic books was her powers. In the cartoon, they were fire based. However, Marvel had a number of characters who could control and/or create fire, so they changed her mutant ability to the power to emit and control microwave energy.

Amazing Friends 2006
To commemorate the 25th anniversary of the show, Marvel released Spider-Man Family: Amazing Friends #1 on August 9, 2006. The comic starts with an all-new story, "Opposites Attack", which is officially set before Web of Spider-Man #75. After that is a Mini Marvel tale, "Spider-Man And His Amazing Friends Co-Workers" (note that the strikethrough of "Friends" was a deliberate inclusion in the title). Both stories were written by Sean McKeever.

The remainder of the one-shot is composed of reprints of Untold Tales of Spider-Man #2 and Spider-Man 2099 #2.

Ultimate Spider-Man
An arc in Ultimate Spider-Man is titled "Spider-Man And His Amazing Friends" and issue #118's cover, showing Spider-Man, Iceman, and Firestar, is a homage to the series title screen. Johnny Storm and Kitty Pryde are also said to be members of the team. Instead of Angelica Jones, Firestar is Liz Allan. Since then, in Ultimate Comics: Spider-Man, Spidey, Iceman, and the Human Torch have begun living together at Aunt May's house and have been working as a team as another homage to the series (because Liz, as Firestar, was a member of the X-Men in this continuity; this team roster also reflects the original intent of Amazing Friends to use the Human Torch before licensing issues forced the creation of Firestar).

Amazing Friends in-continuity?
In 2007's Official Handbook of the Marvel Universe—Spider-Man: Back in Black one-shot, the villain Videoman is given a brief biography from his "retcon" appearance in the Spider-Man Family one-shot. There is also an annotation describing an "Earth 8107", where an alternate reality Videoman was created by Electro to battle that world's Spider-Man. Later, in the same reality, Francis Byte is mutated by an exploding arcade console to become a new Videoman, and later "possibly" join the X-Men. Essentially, this places the events of Spider-Man and His Amazing Friends — or at the very least, the episodes "Videoman" and "The Education of a Superhero" — in an alternate-Earth continuity of the Marvel Comics Multiverse.

Spider-Verse
The Spider-Friends of Earth-1983 (described as a "kinder, gentler than most" world), except for Ms. Lion, are apparently killed by a dimension-hopping Morlun, set on draining the life out of every variation of Spider-Man across the multiverse.

Iceman 2018
At the "Street Cart Named Desire Festival", Peter sees Angelica, but doesn't seem to recognize her when explaining to Mary Jane that she's the only redhead that he's interested in. Bobby and Angelica briefly catch up before returning to their dates which are then interrupted by an ice monster attack. Iceman, Firestar, and Spider-Man suit up and defeat the attacker together. The team-up is called "Iceman and His amazing Friends" both on the issue's cover and by Iceman in the story. Afterward, the trio chat and Angelica and Bobby commiserate about men on dating apps.

References

External links
Disney+ page

1980s American animated television series
1981 American television series debuts
1983 American television series endings
American children's animated action television series
American children's animated adventure television series
American children's animated science fantasy television series
American children's animated superhero television series
Animated Spider-Man television series
Animated television series based on Marvel Comics
Fictional quartets
Marvel Action Universe
NBC original programming
 
Television shows based on Marvel Comics
Television shows set in New York City
Television series by Marvel Productions
Television series by Saban Entertainment
Television series about mutants